Neuralized E3 ubiquitin protein ligase 3 is a protein that in humans is encoded by the NEURL3 gene.

References

Further reading